Billo De Ghar is début album by Pakistani pop singer Abrar-ul-Haq. It was written, composed and sung by the artist and became a best selling album in South Asia at the time of its release in 1995. As of 2004, over 16million copies of the album have been sold. The lyrics of the songs are in Punjabi and Urdu.

Although the album's title song "Billo De Ghar" is in Punjabi, only three of the album's ten tracks are in Punjabi, while the rest are in Urdu.

"Billo De Ghar" describes a man trying to meet with a girl, Billo, and is harassed by an assortment of police and moralists in the process. The song became a subject of some controversy when Urdu newspapers began quoting Lahori mullahs who claimed the song describing a man falling in love with a prostitute and wanting to marry her. Upon the formation of Nawaz Sharif's PML-N majority government after the 1997 election, the song was banned from state-owned TV and radio channels.  Abrar-ul-Haq has continued to follow up on the long-standing popularity of the song since its release. His 2016 album Billo Returns Aithay Rakh offered new material for fans of the song, with the track "Aaj Bhi Billo Zinda Hai" in particular resurrecting the theme.

"Murree Shehry Di Niki," is another one of the three Punjabi tracks, and is in a dialect of Punjabi called Pothohari which is  mostly spoken in Murree, Islamabad and Rawalpindi. It may be an influence of the time Abrar spent in Islamabad for his Master's degree.

Track listing
Billo (a.k.a. Billo De Ghar)
Murree Shehry Di Niki
Aaja Na
Hum Tum Mile The
Sohni Surat
Agar Kabhi
Alam E Bhaghawat
Allah Pakistan
Sachian Te Koorian
Dil Pe Hamare Jo Chaye

References

1995 debut albums
Abrar-ul-Haq albums
Punjabi-language albums
Urdu-language albums